Cervera de la Cañada is a municipality located in the province of Zaragoza, Aragon, Spain. According to the 2011 census (INE), the municipality has a population of 319 inhabitants.

The church of Santa Tecla in Cervera is in the list of World Heritage Sites of (UNESCO) since 2001.

References

Municipalities in the Province of Zaragoza